Efferent nerve fibers refer to axonal projections that exit a particular region; as opposed to afferent projections that arrive at the region. These terms have a slightly different meaning in the context of the peripheral nervous system (PNS) and central nervous system (CNS). The efferent fiber is  a long process projecting far from the neuron's body that carries nerve impulses away from the central nervous system toward the peripheral effector organs (mainly muscles and glands). A bundle of these fibers is called an efferent nerve (if it connects to muscles, then it is a motor nerve). The opposite direction of neural activity is afferent conduction, which carries impulses by way of the afferent nerve fibers of sensory neurons.

In the nervous system there is a "closed loop" system of sensation, decision, and reactions. This process is carried out through the activity of sensory neurons, interneurons, and motor neurons.

In the CNS, afferent and efferent projections can be from the perspective of any given brain region. That is, each brain region has its own unique set of afferent and efferent projections. In the context of a given brain region, afferents are arriving fibers while efferents are exiting fibers.

Structure

Motor nerve

The efferent nerve fibers of motor neurons are involved in muscle control, both skeletal and smooth muscle. The cell body of the motor neuron is connected to a single, long axon and several shorter dendrites projecting out of the cell body itself. This axon then forms a neuromuscular junction with the effectors. The cell body of the motor neuron is satellite-shaped. The motor neuron is present in the grey matter of the spinal cord and medulla oblongata, and forms an electrochemical pathway to the effector organ or muscle. Besides motor nerves, there are efferent sensory nerves that often serve to adjust the sensitivity of the signal relayed by the afferent sensory nerve.

Types
There are three types of efferent fibers: general somatic efferent fibers (GSE), general visceral efferent fibers (GVE) and special visceral efferent fibers (SVE).

Subtypes of general somatic efferent fibers include:  alpha motor neurons (α) – these target extrafusal muscle fibers, and gamma motor neurons (γ) that target intrafusal muscle fibers. Beta motor neurons target both types of muscle fiber and there are two types known as static and dynamic.

Etymology and mnemonics
Both afferent and efferent come from French, evolved from Latin (the basis of many terms in medicine and biology) for the terms, respectively, ad ferens (Latin verb ferre: carry), meaning carrying into, and ex ferens, meaning carrying away (ad literally means to, and e = ex means from). Ad and ex give an easy mnemonic device for remembering the relationship between afferent and efferent: afferent connection arrives and an efferent connection exits.

Afferent and efferent are connected to affect and effect through their common Latin roots: Afferent nerves affect the subject, whereas efferent nerves allow the subject to effect change.

See also 
 Motor neuron (efferent neuron)
 Motor nerve

References

Peripheral nervous system
Medical mnemonics